2015 Universiade may refer to:

2015 Summer Universiade, a summer sporting event held in Gwangju
2015 Winter Universiade, a winter sporting event